The Bursidae, common name "frog snails" or "frog shells", are a rather small taxonomic family of large sea snails, marine gastropod predatory snails in the clade Littorinimorpha.

Distribution
Most species in this family occur on rocks or coral reefs in shallow waters of tropical oceans, including the Indo-Pacific, the Caribbean Sea, and other marginal warm seas, but they are also found in the Atlantic Ocean and the Mediterranean Sea. Only a few are found on sandy bottoms of deeper waters of the continental shelf.

Shell description
The thick, ovate to slightly elongated shells are coarsely sculptured, resembling the triton shells of the Ranellidae. The intersection of the spiral ribs and the axial sculpture results in a strong nodulose pattern of more or less round knobs. This warty surface gave them their common name - frog shells. The outer varicose lip is dilated and shows a number of labial plicae, resulting in a toothed lip on the inside. The inner lip is calloused, showing transverse plicae.

The anterior and posterior canals are well developed. The siphonal canal at the anterior end is usually short. The anal canal at the  posterior end is a deep slot. The strong axial varices are often in two continuous series per whorl, one down each side of the shell. The nucleus of the corneous operculum is situated either at the anterior end or the mid-inner margin. A periostracum (hairy covering of the outer shell) is usually absent or thin.

Anatomy
The taenioglossate radula has seven teeth in each row: one central tooth, flanked on each side by one lateral and two marginal teeth. The central tooth is saddle-shaped, with long basal limbs, each bearing a cusp-like spur upon its face.

Their eyes are based at the base of their filiform tentacles. The foot is short and thick.

Fertilization is internal. The female snail lays her eggs enclosed in a jelly-like matrix that she sometimes broods with her foot. After hatching, the eggs become free-swimming larvae.

Feeding habits 
Frog shells are active predators, and appear to feed on bristle worms (Polychaeta) that they anaesthetize with acidic saliva through their extensible, distally flattened  probosces.

Genera
Genera in the family Bursidae include:

 †Aquitanobursa M. T. Sanders, Merle & Puillandre, 2019 
 Aspa H. Adams & A. Adams, 1853
 Bufonaria  Schumacher, 1817 
 Bursa Roding, 1798   
 Bursina  Oyama 1964  - assigned to Bursidae by Beu in 2005
 Crossata Jousseaume, 1881   
 Marsupina  Dall, 1904 
 † Ranellina - assigned to Bursidae by Palmer and Brann in 1966
 Tutufa Jousseaume, 1881
Genera brought into synonymy
 Annaperenna Iredale, 1936: synonym of Bursa Röding, 1798
 Bechtelia Emerson & Hertlein, 1964 †: synonym of Marsupina Dall, 1904
 Buffo Montfort, 1810: synonym of Marsupina Dall, 1904
 Bufonariella Thiele, 1929: synonym of Bursa Röding, 1798
 Chasmotheca Dall, 1904: synonym of Bufonaria Schumacher, 1817
 Colubrellina Fischer, 1884: synonym of Bursa Röding, 1798
 Dulcerana Oyama, 1964: synonym of Bursa Röding, 1798
 Lampadopsis P. Fischer, 1884: synonym of Bursa Röding, 1798
 Lampas Schumacher, 1817: synonym of Tutufa (Tutufella) Beu, 1981
 Lampasopsis Jousseaume, 1881: synonym of Bursa Röding, 1798
 Pseudobursa Rovereto, 1899: synonym of Bursa Röding, 1798
 Tritonoranella Oyama, 1964: synonym of Bursa Röding, 1798
 Tutufella Beu, 1981: synonym of Tutufa (Tutufella) Beu, 1981

References

Footnotes
 Bouchet P. & Rocroi J.-P. (2005) Classification and nomenclator of gastropod families. Malacologia 47(1-2): 1-397.

External links 

  Beu A.G. 1998. Indo-West Pacific Ranellidae, Bursidae and Personidae (Mollusca: Gastropoda). A monograph of the New Caledonian fauna and revisions of related taxa. Mémoires du Muséum national d'Histoire naturelle 178: 1-255=
 Photos of Bursidae

 
Taxa named by Johannes Thiele (zoologist)